Strontium barium niobate is the chemical compound  SrxBa1−xNb2O6 for 0.32≤x≤0.82.

Strontium barium niobate is a ferroelectric material commonly used in single crystal form in electro-optics, acousto-optics, and photorefractive non-linear optics for its photorefractive properties.

Strontium barium niobate is one of the few tetragonal tungsten bronze compounds without volatile elements making it a useful system for probing structure-property relations.  Strontium barium niobate is a normal ferroelectric for Barium-rich compositions and becomes a relaxor ferroelectric with increasing strontium content.  This has been attributed to positional disorder of the A-site cations  alongside incommensurate oxygen octahedral tilting 

Strontium barium niobate is one of numerous ceramic materials that are known to exhibit abnormal grain growth, in which certain grains grow very large within a matrix of finer equiaxed grains. This abnormal grain growth (AGG) has significant consequences on the dielectric and  electronic performance of strontium barium niobate

References

Strontium compounds
Barium compounds
Niobates